Andrew Laing (born 1966) is a New Zealand actor best known for his role as Dr. Geoff Greenlaw in the popular soap opera, Shortland Street. He is also known for his theatre work. Laing graduated from Toi Whakaari: New Zealand Drama School with a Diploma in Acting in 1988.

Filmography

References

 

1966 births
Living people
New Zealand male stage actors
New Zealand male television actors
New Zealand male voice actors
New Zealand male soap opera actors
20th-century New Zealand male actors
21st-century New Zealand male actors
Toi Whakaari alumni